The Alophini are a weevil tribe in the subfamily Entiminae.

Genera 
 Acmaegenius
 Centron
 Ctenolobus
 Geralophus
 Graptus
 Lepidophorus
 Limalophus
 Plinthodes
 Pseudalophus
 Pseudobarynotus
 Rhytideres
 Seidlitzia
 Trichalophus
 Triglyphulus
 Xeralophus

References 

 LeConte, J.L. 1874: The classification of the rhynchophorous Coleoptera. The American naturalist, 8(7): 385-396

External links 

Entiminae
Beetle tribes